Kawuruth Danne Na is a 2021 Sri Lankan Sinhalese-language political thriller film directed by Bennett Rathnayake and co-produced by director himself with Samanmalee Hewamanna for Benn Films. It stars Bimal Jayakody and Udari Warnakulasooriya in lead roles along with Kumara Thirimadura, Sangeetha Weeraratne and Lucky Dias made supportive roles. The film deals with corrupt and unfair rules and laws in several government officials, where a 17 years old poor schoolgirl goes to the probation prison for stealing 8 nuts of coconut, but nothing happened for corrupted officials, businessmen and drug lords.

Cast
 Bimal Jayakody
 Sangeetha Weeraratne as Theja Madugalle 
 Udari Warnakulasooriya
 Lucky Dias
 Kumara Thirimadura
 Buddhika Jayaratne
 Gihan Fernando
 Buddhadasa Vithanarachchi
 Duleeka Marapana
 Udara Rathnayake
 Darshan Dharmaraj
 Isuru Lokuhettiarachchi
 Jayani Senanayake
 Nethalie Nanayakkara
 Ajith Lokuge
 Teena Shanel
 Adam Adamally
 Uditha Gunaratna
 Lasantha Fansiz
 Dinusha Rajapaksa
 Nimeshika Aan
 Ferni Roshani
 Crystal Imera
 Aruni Me
 Malkanthi Jayasinghe
 Sathya Ratnayake

Production
This is the fifth cinematic direction by Bennett Rathnayake. Danushka Goonetileke is the cinematographer. Prasanna Itthapana joins in the support direction whereas Sujiwa Gunaratne is the artistic director. Ashoka Ariyaratne contributes to the production management. Kumara Karawdeniya is a fashion designer and Priyantha Dissanayake joins the casting. Music composed by Milinda Tennakoon and sound design by Priyantha Kaluarachchi. Lyrics of the film songs done by Dr. Sunil Ariyaratne and background vocals by Dr. Nanda Malini. The film is edited by Ajith Ramanayake and Visual effects done by Chathara Weeraman and color combination by Dinidu Jagoda.

Release
The trailer of the film was released on 27 January 2021 through YouTube. The premiere took place on January 31, 2021, in Melbourne, Australia. The film was released in Sri Lanka on 22 December 2021. Before that, the film was successfully screened in Australia and New Zealand. It is the first Sinhala film to receive a continuous multiple show Sunday screening slots in Australian theatres in Melbourne, Adelaide and Sydney as well as received housefull audience.

References

External links
 

2021 films
2021 drama films
2020s Sinhala-language films
Sri Lankan drama films